Ciulama is a dish that can be mainly found in Romanian and Moldovan cuisine. However, this dish has its origins in Turkish cuisine (çullama), otherwise related to the Romanian cuisine. It is prepared from meat (especially poultry) or mushrooms in white sauce. The sauce is made from flour with cream.

See also
 List of mushroom dishes

References

External links
 Romanian Cuisine. Bucharestian.com.

Romanian cuisine
Moldovan cuisine
Mushroom dishes
Poultry dishes